Shivanath is a Gaupalika in Baitadi District in the Sudurpashchim Province of far-western Nepal. 
Shivanath has a population of 17115.The land area is 81.65 km2.

References

Rural municipalities in Baitadi District
Rural municipalities of Nepal established in 2017